Saint Viventiolus (460 – July 12, 524) (also known as Juventiole) was the Archbishop of Lyon (ancient Lugdunum) 514–523. Later canonized and venerated as a saint within the Catholic Church, ⁣ref> Archdiocese of Lyon, France at Catholic Saints.info.</ref> his feast Day is July 12. He is recognised in the Orthodox Church and the True Orthodox Church, including amongst the Tikhonites, as a pre-Great Schism Western Saint.

Family
Viventiolus and his brother Rusticus were the sons of Aquilinus (c. 430-c. 470), a nobleman of Lyon, and friend of Sidonius Apollinaris (c. 400). Aquilinus was a vicarius of a province in Gaul between 423 and 448 under Apollinaris, the father of Sidonius.

Through his paternal grandmother, Tullia, Viventiolus was the great-grandson of Saint Eucherius and his wife Gallia. His paternal grandfather was the son of Decimus Rusticus and his wife Artemia.

Career
Viventiolus was a monk of St. Oyend (St. Claude), in Jura, where he was elected prior. Avitus of Vienne recommended him for the See of Lyon. In 517, he and Avitus presided over the Council of Epaone.

He is also the author of a book Life of the Jura Fathers, which described the beginnings of monasticism in that region.

References

Bibliography

 Bishop of Tours Gregory, Historia Francorum (The History of the Franks) (London, England: Penguin Books, Ltd., 1974).
 Sidonius Apollinaris, The Letters of Sidonius (Oxford: Clarendon, 1915) (orig.), pp. clx-clxxxiii; List of Correspondents, Notes, V.ix.1.

460 births
524 deaths
6th-century Burgundian bishops
6th-century Christian saints
Archbishops of Lyon
Gallo-Roman saints
6th-century archbishops
Year of birth unknown
6th-century Latin writers